Sembratovych is a family name in Ukrainian language. It may refer to:

Joseph Sembratovych, (1821-1900) was Primate of the Ukrainian Greek Catholic Church from 1870 to 1882.
Roman Sembratovych, (1875–1905) was a Ukrainian journalist and publicist.
Sylvester Sembratovych, (1836-1898) was Cardinal and Primate of the Ukrainian Greek Catholic Church from 1885 to 1898.

Ukrainian-language surnames